Nishma Gurung (born 11 March 1980) is a Nepalese freestyle swimmer who represented Nepal in the 1996 Summer Olympic Games. Gurung finished 55th out of 55 swimmers in the women's 50m freestyle with a time
of 41.45 seconds.

References

1980 births
Living people
Olympic swimmers of Nepal
Swimmers at the 1996 Summer Olympics
Nepalese female swimmers
Gurung people
20th-century Nepalese women